Fontenay is a commune in the Seine-Maritime département in the Normandy region in northern France.

Geography

Heraldry

Population

Places of interest
 The church of St.Michel, dating from the eleventh century.
 The sixteenth century château du Tôt.
 The Clinarderie manorhouse.

See also
Communes of the Seine-Maritime department

References

External links

Communes of Seine-Maritime